Eugène Frédéric Henri "Henry" Leclerc (2 April 1872 – 12 September 1916) was a French equestrian. He competed in the jumping event at the 1900 Summer Olympics.

References

External links

1872 births
1916 deaths
French male equestrians
Olympic equestrians of France
Equestrians at the 1900 Summer Olympics
Place of birth missing